The Jumo 211 was a German inverted V-12 aircraft engine, Junkers Motoren's primary aircraft engine of World War II.  It was the direct competitor to the  Daimler-Benz DB 601 and closely paralleled its development.  While the Daimler-Benz engine was mostly used in single-engined and twin-engined fighters, the Jumo engine was primarily used in bombers such as Junkers' own Ju 87 and Ju 88, and Heinkel's H-series examples of the Heinkel He 111 medium bomber. It was the most-produced German aero engine of the war, with almost 70,000 examples completed.

Design and development
The Jumo 211 was developed by Dr. Franz Josef Neugebauer as scaled-up successor to the earlier Jumo 210. The 210 was Germany's first modern aviation engine, with three valves per cylinder, a cast crankcase, and supercharger as standard. When it was designed in the early 1930s, its 700 PS design power was a relatively common power rating and many pre-war German designs were based around it. As it was further developed, the 210G introduced a piston-driven direct fuel injection, allowing it to reach its full potential.

The 1930s saw rapid improvement in aircraft performance and great increases in size. In 1934, even before the new Jumo 210 had completed its acceptance tests, the RLM sent out a request for a new -class engine of about  weight. Both Jumo and Daimler-Benz responded, and in order to reach service before the new Daimler-Benz DB 600, the Jumo team decided to make their new design as similar as possible to their 210H model, currently in testing.

The resulting Jumo 211 was first prototyped at Jumo's Dessau plant in 1935 and started testing in April 1936. Like the 210H, it featured a mechanical direct fuel injection system using small pistons driven off the crankshaft, three valves per cylinder, and an inverted V layout. It also had an open-cycle cooling system, working at atmospheric pressure. Limited production of the 1,000 PS Jumo 211A started in April 1937 at Dessau, with just over 1,000 completed before full production was started at Magdeburg in July.

Three models were provided with varied settings for its two-speed supercharger, tuned for different low- versus high-altitude performance. The first prototype aircraft powered by the 211A appeared in late 1937. Development of the 211 continued with the 211B being released in 1938, with a slightly increased maximum RPM of 2,400 which boosted power to 1200 PS (1184 HP). The later 211C and 211D differed primarily in the propeller gear ratios and other features.

The competing DB 600 design was generally similar but lacked the direct injection system. When the RLM expressed their opinion that all future engines include this feature, Daimler responded by introducing the DB 601 in late 1937.

A major upgrade was started by Junkers in 1940 adapting the Jumo 211 with a pressurized cooling system. Under pressure, the boiling point of water increases, allowing the engine to run hotter. This, in turn, allows a given amount of cooling fluid to carry away more energy. As a result, the engine could run at higher power settings with a smaller radiator system. The resulting 211E proved to be able to run at much higher power settings without overheating, so it was quickly followed by the 211F which included a strengthened crankshaft and a more efficient supercharger. Running at 2,600 RPM the 211F delivered  and the 211J (a 211F with intercooler) . Further improvements to this basic line led to the  211N and  211P in 1943, they were equivalent to the 211F/J but with slight boost increases and running at up to 2,700 rpm. Continued development of the 211 line evolved into the Jumo 213.

The Jumo 211 became the major bomber engine of the war, in no small part due to Junkers also building a majority of the bombers then in use. Of course, since it was the Luftwaffe that selected the final engine to be used after competitive testing on prototypes (such as the Dornier Do 217), there is certainly more to it. Limited production capacity for each type, and the fact that the Jumo was perfectly capable (if not superior) in a bomber installation meant that it made sense to use both major types to the fullest; since the Daimler had a slight edge in a lightweight, single-engine application, that left the Jumo to fill in the remaining roles as a bomber engine. Even this wasn't enough in the end, and radial engines like the BMW 801 were increasingly put into service alongside the Jumo and DB series, most often in multi-engine installations like the Jumo.

Total production of the 211 series amounted to 68,248 engines, including 1,046 prototypes and development engines, with a production peak of 1700 engines per month in the autumn of 1942. From 1937 to mid-1944, production was spread between factories in Magdeburg, Köthen, Leipzig, Stettin and Strasburg. It was the most-produced German aviation engine of the World War II years, and was quite likely to have been the first model of German aviation engine selected for "unitizing" as a Kraftei pre-packaged "engine module" – such Kraftei units for the Ju 88A were, as one example, used as to power the Messerschmitt Me 264 V1 competitor for the Amerika Bomber contract in December 1942.

Variants
Powers and rotational speeds are for take-off at sealevel.

Applications
Avia S-199
Dornier Do 217 - single engine test aircraft
Focke-Wulf Ta 154
Heinkel He 111E, H and Z
IAR 79
Junkers F 24kai Jumo 211 test bed
Junkers Ju 87
Junkers Ju 88
Junkers Ju 90
Junkers Ju 252
Messerschmitt Me 264 (V1 prototype only, replaced with four BMW 801s)
Messerschmitt Me 323 (only for tests)
Savoia-Marchetti SM.79 (Romanian variants)

Specifications (Jumo 211Ba / 211Da)

See also

References

Bibliography

External links

Photos of two Jumo 211A engines raised from Lake Jonsvatnet, Trondheim, Norway, in 2004 (Adresseavisen)
UK Flight Magazine mid-November 1939 illustration of Kraftei-unitized Jumo 211 with annular radiator, as used for Ju 88A

Junkers aircraft engines
1930s aircraft piston engines
Inverted V12 aircraft engines